The Jaguar V12 engine is a family of internal combustion V12 engines with a common block design, that were mass-produced by Jaguar Cars for a quarter of a century, from 1971 through 1997, mostly as 5.3litres, but later also as 6litres, and 7litre versions were deployed in racing. Except for a few low-volume exotic sports car makers, Jaguar's V12 engine was the world's first V12 engine in mass-production. For 17 years, Jaguar was the only company in the world consistently producing luxury four-door saloons with a V12 engine. The V12 powered all three series of the original Jaguar XJ luxury saloons, as well as its second generation XJ40 and X305 successors.

Originally fitted with carburettors, the V12s received electronic fuel injection in 1975. In 1981, the engines were improved with higher efficiency (HE) cylinder heads. After two decades, the enlarged 6litre V12 was offered in production in the XJS and Daimler Double Six, from 1991 and 1993 respectively. Including the V12 E-Type mark3 models, and in the XJS (from 1975 to 1996), Jaguar made a total of 161,583 V12-engined cars. The Jaguar V12 was regarded as one of the premier power plants of the 1970s and 1980s. After launching the second generation XJseries in 1986, Jaguar developed their V12 into the racing engines that brought two overall victories at the 24hours of LeMans endurance races of 1988 and 1990.

Remarkably, three decades earlier, the engine was initiated in 1951 by Claude Baily as a prototype design for an intended LeMans racecar: the Jaguar XJ13. The XJ13 project was however terminated in 1966, before the car ever entered into competition. Nevertheless, under the direction of Jaguar Chief Engineer William Heynes, the V12 engine design was reworked by engineers Walter Hassan and Harry Mundy into a road-going production-vehicle version, first installed in the Jaguar E-Type mark 3 of 1971. The V12 was just the second production engine design in Jaguar's history, after the 1949 straight-six XK engine, built through 1992. It uses an all-aluminium block and cylinder heads with removable wet steel liners, and single overhead camshafts with two valves per cylinder.

Development
Initial designs for a V12 engine were produced by engineer Claude Baily as early as 1951, with a view to using it in a LeMans race-car. Baily's original 8.0 L design used double overhead camshafts heads sharing the same basic layout as the XK6 engine, in order to allow for a relatively high redline. Even after Jaguar withdrew from racing in 1957, the V12 design continued to be refined, and Baily proposed a range of displacements from 7.6 L (sharing 87 mm bore and 106 mm stroke measurements with the 3.8 L XK6) down to 5.0 L (sharing the 2.4 L XK6's 83 mm bore and 76.5 mm stroke). In 1962 Baily was instructed to begin prototype tooling and bench testing of a 5.0 L design, having settled on an 87 mm bore and 70 mm stroke.

By 1964 several incarnations of the V12 engine were being tested, including versions meant for racing and others for installation into production cars. An all-aluminium quad-cam design with fuel injection was created for the XJ13, while cast iron blocks and heads, and other double and single overhead cam head designs were created for use in a production road car version. These production versions of the engine were tested in Mark X saloons.

After the XJ13 project was cancelled the team of Hassan and Mundy designed a new single overhead cam head, with the camshaft lobes acting directly on vertically-inclined valves through bucket tappets. This was similar to the cylinder head design of the contemporary Rover 2000, with which the Jaguar V12 also shared the use of dished 'Heron' pistons. These changes reduced complexity, weight, size and noise, and were anticipated to help the engine meet future emissions standards.

The chain-driven SOHC heads and the softer valve springs fitted to reduce valve train noise resulted in the red line being lowered to 6,500 rpm from the 8,000 rpm of the original DOHC design. The engine was continuously refined with various carburettor and fuel injection arrangements before finally seeing production in the Series III E-Type in 1971.

5.3 Litre
Right from the start of production in 1971 the V12 engine had Lucas OPUS (Oscillating Pick-Up System) electronic ignition. Initially the OPUS ignition amplifier unit was secured directly to the engine between the cylinder heads and had problems due to overheating. In later cars the ignition amplifier had been moved away from the engine where it could get air flow for cooling. Originally the V12 was supposed to use an advanced fuel injection system under development by AE Brico but this plan was cancelled at a late stage, possibly due to concerns that the design was too similar to Bosch products. The V12 as used in the Series 3 E-Types, Series 1 XJ12 and early Series 2 XJ12s (1973-April 1975) had four side draft Zenith-Stromberg carburettors. After April 1975, the V12 engine used in the Series 2 XJ12 and the new XJ-S had a licensed copy of the Bosch D-Jetronic system adapted by Lucas for use on the V12.

This version was used in the following cars:
 1971-1974 Jaguar E-Type
 1975–1981 Jaguar XJS
 1972–1981 Jaguar XJ12 (Series 1 and 2)
 1973–1981 Daimler Double-Six (Series 1 and 2)
 1972-1981 Panther J.72
 1974-1985 Panther De Ville

5.3 Litre HE
A "high-efficiency" (HE) version of the engine debuted in 1981, using special high-swirl design cylinder heads designed by Swiss racing driver Michael May. May's design consisted of a swirl chamber at the exhaust valve with a channel around the intake valve. The use of conventional flat-topped pistons in lieu of the original design's dished type allowed squish from the compression stroke to push the air through the channel around the intake valve to the chamber below the exhaust valve, causing turbulent swirling flow around the spark plug (which had been relocated near the exhaust valve at the top of the chamber). This design created a stratified charge, allowing the engine to run at an unusually high compression ratio for the time (10.5:1 to 12.5:1, depending on market and year) while running a relatively lean fuel mixture. In any given market power levels remained similar to the previous model, but fuel economy was improved by nearly 50%. A new fuel injection system called "Digital P" featuring a digital ECU with integrated manifold air pressure transducer was installed, replacing the older analogue control unit and remote pressure sensor from Bosch's original D-Jetronic design. (However, cars sold in Australia, Sweden and Switzerland continued to use the D-Jetronic system until at least 1985.)

The OPUS ignition was replaced by Lucas's Constant Energy Ignition (CEI) in 1982, to deliver a more reliable spark. Series 3 XJ12 and Daimler Double Six cars used the CEI system until the end of their production in 1992, but it was superseded in the XJ-S in mid-1989 by another from Magneti Marelli. The Marelli ignition system was used until the end of XJ-S production, and on the  version used in the XJ81 four-door saloons made in 1993 and 1994.

The 5.3 HE was used in the following applications:
 1981–1992 Jaguar XJ12 (Series 3)
 1981–1992 Jaguar XJ-S
 1981–1992 Daimler Double-Six (Series 3)

6.0 Litre HE

The  engine on X305 used a new Nippondenso distributorless crank-fired ignition system with coil packs very similar to Ford EDIS-6 units. The last Jaguar V12 engine was produced on 17 April 1997.

The 6.0 HE was used in the following cars:
 1992–1995 Jaguar XJS
 1991–1993 Jaguar XJR-S 6.0
 1993–1997 Jaguar XJ12 (XJ81 and X300)
 1993–1997 Daimler Double-Six (XJ81 and X300)

TWR
In 1985, Tom Walkinshaw Racing became Jaguar's official team in World Endurance Championship, taking over the project from American team Group 44. By 1991, the V12 was good for 7.4 L inside the XJR12, developing an impressive 

TWR also upgraded production Jaguar cars (usually XJRS's), with a variety of styling, handling and performance modifications. Most of the cars thus modified were straight from the Jaguar factory and sold through Jaguar dealerships.

By 1989, TWR were selling moderate numbers of XJRS's fitted with a  version of the V12, which pre-dated the Jaguar production version by some 3 years.

Lister
Lister Cars, a well-known Jaguar tuner with a long history of technical collaboration with the British automaker, made frequent use of this powerplant. The first Jaguar Lister XJRS's were built by the company BLE Automotive in Erdington, Birmingham in the early 1980s until the Lister brand was passed on to WP Automotive of Leatherhead. In 1991, they fitted the  version of the engine, with a  bore and stroke, into a modified Jaguar XJS, which was rebadged Lister Le Mans. From 1993, Lister Cars owner Laurence Pearce produced the company's first in house design the Lister Storm, which, naturally, continued using the V12 engine, both on the road and on the track, the car becoming a mainstay of the FIA GT Championship and several national championships for the following decade.

See also
 Jaguar XK6 engine
 Coventry Climax
 Jaguar AJ6 engine

References

External links
 V12 engine page at the Jaguar Daimler Heritage Trust site 

 

V12
Gasoline engines by model
V12 engines